Lang Fisher (born January 29, 1980) is an American comedy writer and director. She co-created and executive produced the Netflix coming-of-age comedy-drama series, Never Have I Ever.

Career 
Fisher graduated from Fountain Valley School of Colorado in 1998 and Columbia University in 2002. At Columbia, she was a member of the annual Varsity Show. Her cast and staff-mates included future actress Jenny Slate, comedian Michelle Collins, Gabe Liedman, who is the show-runner of Netflix animated series Q-Force and Hulu comedy series PEN15, Emmy Award-nominated stage actor Brandon Victor Dixon, managing editor of The Onion and Upworthy co-founder Peter Koechley, Onion News Network founder and director Will Graham, and Robby Mook, manager of Hillary Clinton's 2016 presidential campaign. Her classmates also included award-winning director and producer Susanna Fogel.

She was a staff writer for The Onion as well as its TV spin-off, the Onion News Network, for six years and was a member of its award-winning writing staff before joining 30 Rock as a staff writer in its final season. The episode she co-wrote, "A Goon's Deed in a Weary World", received critical acclaim and was named by Variety magazine as one of the "25 Best TV Episodes of the Decade (2010-2019)" in 2019.

From 2013 to 2017, Fisher wrote, directed and co-executive produced on the romantic comedy series, The Mindy Project. She started writing on the series in season 2. Fisher wrote the 12th episode of season 5, "Mindy Lahiri is a White Man."

From 2017 to 2019, Fisher was a writer and Co-Executive Producer on the police procedural comedy, Brooklyn Nine-Nine. Fisher wrote the 8th episode of the show's 6th season, titled "He Said, She Said." The episode explored sexual assault in the workplace and was Stephanie Beatriz's directorial debut. She also wrote the episodes ''Hitchcock & Scully" and ''The Puzzle Master" for the show.

In 2019, Fisher wrote and co-created Never Have I Ever with Mindy Kaling and serves as the showrunner.

Filmography

Awards 
Fisher was nominated for the Writers Guild of America Award for Television: Comedy Series in 2014 for her work on 30 Rock. She was nominated in 2021 for the NAACP Image Award for Outstanding Writing in a Comedy Series.

In 2008, she was part of The Onion's team that won the Peabody Awards.

References

External links 

 

1980 births
Living people
Columbia College (New York) alumni
Peabody Award winners
American women television writers
American women television producers
21st-century American women